Dirck or Theodoor Galle (16 July 1571 – 18 December 1633) was a Flemish Baroque engraver.

Biography
He learned the art of engraving from his father Philip Galle. He married Catharina Moerentorff (Moretus), daughter of the prominent printer Jan Moretus and Maertine Plantijn. Maertine was the daughter of the founder of the Plantin Moretus printing house in Antwerp Christophe Plantin. Galle was one of the engravers linked to the Plantin Moretus press.

He became a member of the Guild of St. Luke in 1595, and became deacon in 1609.

He was the teacher of his son Joannes Galle, and the engravers Adriaen Millaert, and Gilles van Schoor. Joannes Galle later became a member of the Guild of St. Luke in 1627, and became deacon in 1638.

References

External links

1571 births
1633 deaths
16th-century engravers
17th-century engravers
Flemish engravers
Artists from Antwerp
Painters from Antwerp